Dekh Kabira Roya is a 1957 romantic comedy film, directed by Amiya Chakravarty.

The tag line in the title says 'The truth is stranger than fiction. Comedy is exaggeration of truth'.

Plot summary
This Bollywood classic is a farcical comedy about the vicissitudes of modern love. Mohan (Anoop Kumar), Pradeep (Daljit), and Ranjeet (Jawahar Kaul) are three struggling artists—singer, painter, and writer, respectively—who live together in the same rooming house. Romantic hijinks ensue when the trio meet three lovely girls, Geeta (Ameeta), Rekha (Anita Guha), and Kalpana (Shubha Khote), with very specific ideas about art and love. The three male friends decide to help each other out by using their talents, and utter and hilarious chaos reigns.

Cast

 Anita Guha as Rekha
 Anoop Kumar as Mohan
 Jawahar Kaul as Pradeep
 Ameeta as Geeta
 Daljeet as Ranjeet
 Shubha Khote as Kalpana
 Shivraj as Rekha's Father
 Parveen Paul as Geeta's Mother
 Sunder as the coffee house waiter who plays a central role in disentangling the situation
 Rirkoo as Arjun, Kalpana's cricket playing brother
 Ratan Gaurang as peon

Crew

Director: Amiya Chakrabarty

Editor: C. Ramarao

Writer: Chandrakant, Amiya Chakrabarty, Manoranjan Ghose

Producer: Amiya Chakrabarty

Music: Madan Mohan

Cinematographer: Ajit Kumar

Soundtrack 
The music was composed by Madan Mohan. The songs were penned by Rajendra Krishan. The following is a list of songs featured in this film.

Trivia
 Probably the only movie in which three songs are played in continuation  - 'Meri Veena tum bin roye', 'Ashqon se teri hamne' and 'Tu pyar kare ya thukraye' in sequence picturized on three actresses and ending with 'Meri veena..'
 Sunder who plays the waiter, hums the song 'Ae mere dil kahin aur chal' from 1952 movie 'Daag' , while resolving the misunderstanding at the end.

References

External links
 

1957 films
1950s Hindi-language films
Indian romantic comedy films
1957 romantic comedy films
Films scored by Madan Mohan
Films directed by Amiya Chakravarty